In molecular biology, the EMI domain, first named after its presence in proteins of the EMILIN family, is a small cysteine-rich protein domain of around 75 amino acids. The EMI domain is most often found at the N terminus of metazoan extracellular proteins that are forming or are compatible with multimer formation. It is found in association with other domains, such as C1q, laminin-type EGF-like, collagen-like, FN3, WAP, ZP or FAS1. It has been suggested that the EMI domain could be a protein-protein interaction module, as the EMI domain of EMILIN-1 was found to interact with the C1q domain of EMILIN-2.

The EMI domain possesses six highly conserved cysteine residues, which likely form disulphide bonds. Other key features of the EMI domain are the C-C-x-G-[WYFH] pattern, a hydrophobic position just preceding the first cysteine (Cys1) of the domain and a cluster of hydrophobic residues between Cys3 and Cys4. The EMI domain could be made of two sub-domains, the fold of the second one sharing similarities with the C-terminal sub-module characteristic of EGF-like domains.

Proteins known to contain an EMI domain include:

Vertebrate Emilins, extracellular matrix glycoproteins.
Vertebrate Multimerins, extracellular matrix glycoproteins.
Vertebrate Emu proteins, which could interact with several different extracellular matrix components and serve to connect and integrate the function of multiple partner molecules.
Vertebrate beta-IG-H3.
Vertebrate osteoblast-specific factor 2 (OSF-2).
Mammalian NEU1/NG3 proteins.
Drosophila midline fasciclin.
Caenorhabditis elegans ced-1, a transmembrane receptor that mediates cell corpse engulfment.

References

Protein domains